Hacallı (also, Gadzhally) is a village in the Tovuz Rayon of Azerbaijan.

References 

Populated places in Tovuz District